Auriculoceryx basalis is a moth of the family Erebidae. It was described by Francis Walker in 1865. It is found on Peninsular Malaysia, Sumatra and in Thailand.

References

External links
 

Syntomini
Moths described in 1865
Moths of Asia